The HOPE Program (Helping Outstanding Pupils Educationally) created in 1993 under the supervision of Georgia Governor Zell Miller, is Georgia's scholarship and grant program that rewards students with financial assistance in degree, diploma, and certificate programs at eligible Georgia public and private colleges and universities, and public technical colleges. HOPE is funded entirely by revenue from the Georgia Lottery and is administered by the Georgia Student Finance Commission (GSFC).
  

 The HOPE Scholarship program is for students who have demonstrated academic achievement and are seeking a college degree. There are several ways to become eligible for the HOPE Scholarship, either by graduating from high school as a HOPE Scholar or by earning it while in college. For more information, please review the HOPE Scholarship regulations.
 The HOPE Grant program is for students seeking a technical certification or diploma, regardless of the student's high school grade point average or graduation date. For more information, please review the HOPE Grant regulations.
 The Zell Miller Scholarship program is for students who have demonstrated academic achievement and are seeking a college degree. Generally, to become eligible, a student must graduate from an eligible high school with a 3.70 GPA and a minimum score on the SAT/ACT.

As of 2006, more than $3 billion in scholarships had been awarded to more than 900,000 Georgia students. As of 2018, HOPE has already helped around 1.8 million students from Georgia enroll in college.

The program is entirely merit-based, meaning that a person's eligibility for the scholarship is based on their academic achievement in high school or college.  Previously, traditional-college-age students whose family income exceeded $100,000 per year were disqualified from the program. "is possible to lose, but also regain the HOPE scholarship back, if your GPA falls underneath the required GPA."

To receive HOPE Scholarship funding, students must meet one of the following academic requirements:

 Graduate from a HOPE-eligible high school with a 3.0 grade point average for college preparatory diploma or a 3.2 grade point average for other diploma types.
 Complete a HOPE eligible home study program with a 3.0 grade point average.
 For all Georgia high school graduates who begin their high school careers during or after the 2008-2009 school year must graduate with a 3.0 grade point average.
 Graduate from an eligible high school, complete an eligible home study program, or earn a GED, and score in the national composite 85th percentile or higher on the SAT or ACT tests.
 Graduate from an ineligible high school or complete an ineligible home study program, and then earn a 3.0 grade point average on 30 semester hours or 45 quarter hours of college degree-level coursework. This option allows for payment of the first 30 semester hours or 45 quarter hours after they are taken.
 Earn a 3.0 grade point average at the college level on degree coursework after attempting 30, 60, or 90 semesters hours or 45, 90, or 135 quarter hours, regardless of high school graduation status.

And all of the following other requirements. 
 Be enrolled as a degree-seeking student at an eligible public or private college or university or technical college in Georgia.
 Meet HOPE's Georgia residency requirements.
 Meet HOPE's U.S. citizenship or eligible non-citizen requirements.
 Be in compliance with Selective Service registration requirements.
 Be in compliance with the Georgia Drug-Free Postsecondary Education Act of 1990. A student may be ineligible for HOPE payment if he or she has been convicted for committing certain felony offenses involving marijuana, controlled substances, or dangerous drugs.
 Not be in default or owe a refund on a student financial aid program.
 Maintain satisfactory academic progress as defined by the college.

The Hope Scholarship regulations and requirements are codified in Georgia law and has undergone a number of changes by the Georgia Legislature.

The scholarship is now based on lottery revenue. Books and mandatory fees have also been eliminated. The scholarship is now capped at 127 credit hours. A student has only 7 years in order to receive payments for the scholarship. For the 2011-2012 school year, the scholarship will pay for 90% of tuition of the 2010-2011 school year. For HOPE recipients who attend private colleges in Georgia, an equivalent amount is applied toward tuition, currently 3,600 for the 2011-2012 year.

There is also another scholarship within HOPE called the Zell Miller Scholarship. In order to qualify for this scholarship, a student must meet all of the requirements of the HOPE Scholarship. A student must also graduate with a 3.7 High School HOPE GPA and must have a score of 1200 (CR+M) on a single administration of the SAT or a 26 ACT Composite and must maintain a college cumulative GPA of a 3.3. This Scholarship will pay for 100% of tuition, including $4,000 at private colleges. Books and mandatory fees have also been eliminated.

Fall 2011 HOPE
HOPE Scholarship for Tuition (based on several GA Univ Rates of $2298 * 90%) = $2068.20 per semester (assumes 15 hours)
- HOPE per hour ($2298 * 90%/15) = $137.88 per hour
- HOPE for Fees = $0
- HOPE for Book Allowance = $0

In 2005, a decrease in lottery revenue led to questions about whether sufficient funding would be available to continue offering the scholarship in its present form. Several suggestions were made to decrease the program's costs, including tying the scholarship to standardized test scores or checking students' college GPAs more frequently to avoid paying tuition for students who had dipped below 3.0.  Political rivals of Governor Sonny Perdue criticized his management of the program, and HOPE's future became an important state political issue.  Much of that year's debate was rendered moot when lottery sales increased the next year.

History

January 14, 1991: Zell Miller is inaugurated as Georgia's 79th governor. He introduces legislation before the General Assembly to establish a lottery. A statewide referendum must be passed to amend the Georgia Constitution to allow a lottery.

January 31, 1991: Resolution to put lottery amendment before voters passes the Georgia House 126-51 and is adopted by a 47-9 vote of the Georgia Senate.

November 3, 1992: Georgia voters pass the lottery amendment 1,146,340-1,050,674.

November 1992-August 1993: Governor Miller establishes three distinct and individually funded lottery programs: the HOPE Scholarship Program, a voluntary pre-kindergarten program for four-year-olds, and an instructional technology program.

June 29, 1993: The first Georgia Lottery ticket is sold, sparking a windfall of unprecedented lottery sales.  Georgia's first year of sales brought in a national record of $1.13 billion, providing $360 million for the three education programs.

September 1, 1993: Georgia's first HOPE Scholarship is awarded to Matthew Miller of Snellville, Georgia to attend Gwinnett Technical College.

July 1, 1994: HOPE makes its first expansion to cover four rather than two years of tuition.  In addition, mandatory fees and a $100 per quarter book allowance will be paid for the first time.

July 1, 1995:

 The $100,000 family income-eligibility cap for HOPE is abolished.
 Governor Miller decides to give students who lose their HOPE Scholarships after their freshman year a second chance. If the student completes the sophomore year with a cumulative B average, they will receive HOPE their junior year.
 Nontraditional students (who graduated before the HOPE program began in 1993) may qualify for HOPE after their sophomore year.

July 11, 1995: President Clinton models his America's Hope program, a tax credit for the cost of two year of education beyond high school, after the success of Georgia's HOPE Program.

July 1, 1996: Private college students for the first time must earn and maintain a B average to receive HOPE. As a result, the previous $1,500 grant is changed to a $3000 scholarship.

November 3, 1996: Entering freshmen high school students (Class of 2000) must now earn a B average in the core curriculum courses of English, math, social studies, foreign language and science to receive the HOPE Scholarship upon graduation.

July 1, 1997: Nontraditional student may now qualify for HOPE after their freshman or sophomore years.

November 18, 1997: The Georgia Student Finance Commission adopts a policy to allow home school students who maintain a B average during their first year in college to retroactively qualify for a HOPE Scholarship during the 1997-1998 school year.

April 1998: The National Association of State Student Grant and Aid Programs (NASSGAP) releases a study that says Georgia is ranked Number One among the 50 states in academic-based student financial aid because of the HOPE Scholarship.

June 29, 1998: The Council on School Performance releases a study that concludes: "We found that recipients of Georgia's HOPE Scholarship are more likely to remain enrolled in college, have higher college grade point averages and have earned more credit hours than students without the scholarship."

September 1, 1998: Five years after its inception, the HOPE Scholarship has awarded 319,000 students more than $580 million.

November 3, 1998: Georgia voters elect to create a Constitutional amendment protecting the HOPE Scholarship Program from legislative and political tampering.

May 17, 1999: For the second year in a row, the National Association of State Student Grant and Aid Programs ranked Georgia Number One among 50 states in academic-based student financial aid because of the HOPE Scholarship.

September 29, 1999: Yomaris Figueroa of McDonough, a freshman at Georgia State University in Atlanta, was congratulated by Governor Roy E. Barnes as Georgia's 400,000th HOPE Scholarship recipient.

March 2000: For the third year in a row, the National Association of State Student Grant and Aid Programs ranked Georgia Number One among 50 states in academic-based student financial aid because of the HOPE Scholarship.

July 1, 2000: Students can receive the full benefits of Georgia's HOPE Scholarship and the federal Pell Grant making a college education for Georgia students even more affordable.

October 2000: Seven years after its inception, the HOPE Scholarship has more than 500,000 awards totaling $1 billion.

March 2001: For the fourth year in a row, the National Association of State Student Grant and Aid Programs ranked Georgia Number One among 50 states in academic-based student financial aid because of the HOPE Scholarship.

April 2002: HOPE reaches new milestones: More than 600,000 students have received HOPE awards totaling more than $1.5 billion. Also, thanks to HOPE, for the fifth year in a row Georgia leads the nation in providing academic-based financial aid.

March 2003: The Georgia General Assembly created the Improvement of the HOPE Scholarship Joint Study Commission. The purpose of the Commission was to identify and recommend actions to ensure adequate funding of the HOPE program for years to come.

April 2003: For the sixth year in a row, the National Association of State Student Grant and Aid Programs ranked Georgia Number One among 50 states in academic-based student financial aid because of the HOPE Scholarship.

January 2004: After meeting throughout the latter half of 2003, the HOPE Study Commission made its recommendations in January 2004.

May 2004: House Bill 1325 was signed into law, creating the most significant changes in the HOPE program since its beginning.

January 2007: The HOPE program reaches the milestone of assisting 1 million individual recipients.

May 2007: The new HOPE Scholarship high school grade point average calculation and transcript exchange project was implemented, in accordance with House Bill 1325 passed in 2004.

July 2008: The HOPE Scholarship award amount for students attending private colleges was increased from $3,000 per academic year to $3,500 per academic year. Senate Bill 492 was implemented, which increased the Georgia residency requirement for the HOPE Scholarship to 24 months for students who did not graduate from high school as a Georgia resident. In addition, changes were made to the treatment of post-secondary coursework taken while in high school, for purposes of the HOPE Scholarship and HOPE Grant eligibility. House Bill 152 was implemented, which allows home study student, ineligible high school graduates, and GED recipients to gain HOPE Scholarship eligibility by scoring in the 85th percentile on the SAT/ACT.

March 2011: Georgia Governor Nathan Deal, together with state legislative leaders, pushed a new law into effect, raising the GPA requirements for HOPE and eliminating payments for books and mandatory fees. The new HOPE Scholarship, or HOPE Lite, will now be based on Lottery revenue. The new scholarship within HOPE, the Zell Miller Scholarship, will cover 100% of tuition for those students who graduate with a 3.7 HOPE GPA and receive a score of 1200 (CR+M) on the SAT or a 26 ACT Composite at public colleges ($4,000 at private colleges), and maintain a 3.3 GPA while in college. Books and fees have also been eliminated for this scholarship as well. These changes also added additional academic rigor requirements to take effect in stages starting in 2015 and going through 2017. These requirements define the type and number of specific core academic courses required for graduation eligibility for the Hope Scholarship, including raising the required GPA for students to be eligible for the HOPE Grant to 3.0. Although these changes have taken some of the strain off of Georgia's finances, it has also resulted in about 1/4th of all Technical College students dropping out of college and increases in the accrued debt of those who remained.

March 2013: State Representative Stacey Evans introduces House Bill 54 to reverse some of the changes to the HOPE Scholarship program and, she claimed, help more Georgia students realize their dream and the original purpose of the HOPE program. Her ideas were incorporated into House Bill 372 which lowered the required GPA for HOPE Grants (the HOPE Scholarship for Technical Schools) back to the original 2.0 and bringing back 5,000 students into Technical College in the first year alone.

Award history

Awards

The money provided to HOPE Scholars varies and depends on the type of institution as well as the student's specific enrollment.

Public institutions

Tuition for number of hours enrolled whether full-time or part-time

Private institutions

Full-time students: $1,800 per semester, $1,300 per quarter

Half-time students: $900 per semester, $670 per quarter

Application procedures

To apply for the HOPE Scholarship, students must follow the registration demands of the school they chose.

Public colleges, universities, and technical colleges

Students planning to attend a public college, university, or technical college have two options for applying for the HOPE Scholarship.
 Complete the Free Application for Federal Student Aid (FAFSA): By using a GAcollege411 account and accessing the FAFSA application from GAcollege411, applicants can reduce the amount of time it takes to complete this form.
 Or one can apply for the HOPE Scholarship by: electronic application, or printable paper application.

Private colleges and universities

Students planning to attend an eligible private college or university must complete the HOPE/TEG application to be considered for the HOPE Scholarship

Goals
The HOPE program has two stated goals:

 To offer academically superior students who would not otherwise be able to afford college the opportunity to receive higher education and
 To offer an incentive to academically-superior students who can afford to attend college to remain in the state of Georgia, countering the "brain drain" phenomenon Georgia was experiencing prior to the program, when many talented students were attending universities in other states.

Criticism

Non-traditional students were not grandfathered in with the 2011 changes. This has led to allegations of age discrimination because students who had not received the grant before Summer 2011 and had graduated from high school more than seven years past were disqualified based on a new "seven year" criteria that has in subsequent years been modified.  Critics were with Governor Nathan Deal and the sponsors of the bill that caused this change.

Similar scholarship lotteries in other states

 Bright Futures Scholarship
 Tennessee Hope Scholarship
 South Carolina Education Lottery
 Kentucky Educational Excellence Scholarship Program
 Kentucky Education Excellence Scholarship Wikipedia Link

References

External links
Georgia's HOPE Scholarship and Grant Program
Georgia Student Finance Commission

Awards established in 1993
Education in Georgia (U.S. state)
Georgia Lottery
Scholarships in the United States